The Datsun mi-Do is a subcompact car manufactured specifically for the Russian market under the Datsun brand of Nissan Motor Company. It is a rebadged and restyled version of the AutoVAZ developed Lada Kalina. The mi-Do was presented in August, 2014.

The car will be equipped with 1.6-litre engine (82 and 87 hp) paired with 5-speed manual or 4-speed automatic gearbox manufactured by Jatco.

Engine 

 Engine configuration: 1596 cc inline-4, 2 valves per cylinder 
 Power:  @ 5100 rpm
 Torque: 140 Nm @ 2700 rpm
 Bore × stroke: 82 mm / 75.6 mm
 Compression ratio: 10.6:1
 Timing drive: Belt
 Top speed: 
 0-100 km/h: 12.2 seconds

See also
Datsun on-Do
Datsun
Lada Kalina

References

External links

mi-Do
Front-wheel-drive vehicles
Sedans
Subcompact cars
2010s cars